Cheongpa-dong is a dong, neighbourhood of Yongsan-gu in Seoul, South Korea.

Education 
 Cheongpa Elementary School
 Shinkwang Elementary School
 Sunrin Middle School
 Baemoon Middle School
 Sunrin Internet High School
 Shinkwang Women's High School
 Baemoon High School

See also 
Administrative divisions of South Korea

References

External links
 Yongsan-gu official website
 Yongsan-gu official website
 Cheongpa 1-dong resident office website

Neighbourhoods of Yongsan District